Colombia competed at the 2022 Winter Olympics in Beijing, China, from 4 to 20 February 2022.

Laura Gómez and Carlos Andres Quintana were the country's flagbearer during the opening ceremony. Gómez was also the flagbearer during the closing ceremony.

Competitors
The following is the list of number of competitors who participated at the Games per sport/discipline.

Alpine skiing

By meeting the basic qualification standards, Colombia qualified one male alpine skier.

Men

Cross-country skiing

By meeting the basic qualification standards, Colombia qualified one male cross-country skier.

Distance

Speed skating

Colombia qualified one female speed skater in the mass start event. The quota was earned through the 2021–22 ISU Speed Skating World Cup.

Mass start

See also
Tropical nations at the Winter Olympics

References

Nations at the 2022 Winter Olympics
2022
Winter Olympics